Gray G. Haddock is an American actor and film producer. He is the former head of animation at Rooster Teeth, a production studio in Austin, Texas, where he created the 2019 mecha web series Gen:Lock. He is known for voice roles such as Locus and Roman Torchwick in the Rooster Teeth productions Red vs. Blue and RWBY, respectively, as well as Sanosuke Sagara in the English dub of Rurouni Kenshin, Oreldo in Pumpkin Scissors, and Yousuke Fuuma from  Wedding Peach.

Career 
Gray Haddock graduated from the University of Texas at Austin in 1996.

Haddock received his first voice acting credit in 1995. He acted for many years, primarily as a voice actor in English dubbed versions of Japanese anime. In 1997, he was cast as Sanosuke Sagara in the film Rurouni Kenshin: Requiem for the Ishin Patriots, a role which he reprised in the 2001 film Rurouni Kenshin: Reflection and the Rurouni Kenshin: New Kyoto Arc two-film series in 2011 and 2012. In 1998, he played the role of Lei Wulong in Tekken: The Motion Picture.

In August 2011, Haddock was hired by Rooster Teeth as a visual effects artist and digital compositor working on season 9 of Red vs. Blue. He then worked on season 10 of Red vs. Blue and, in 2013, he took on a voice acting position as Roman Torchwick in Rooster Teeth's animated series, RWBY. He also took on the role of Locus in Red vs. Blue, a character that debuted in Season 11.

In 2014, Haddock co-starred in the two-hander play Venus in Fur, opposite Molly Karrasch and directed by his wife Lara Toner.

In 2014, Haddock worked as a producer on the second season of RWBY. In September 2014, he became head of the newly-formed Rooster Teeth Animation department. When production started on its third season in 2015, Haddock became a co-director and producer for RWBY. In 2018, he became writer and director for a mecha series on Rooster Teeth, Gen:Lock. In June 2019, following complaints from his former employees regarding negative working conditions, Haddock stepped down as the head of RT Animation to fulfill a strictly creative role. Later, on September 14, 2019, Haddock left Rooster Teeth.

Filmography

Voice acting

Live action

Production

References

External links 

 
 
 

20th-century American male actors
21st-century American male actors
21st-century American screenwriters
American animated film producers
American male video game actors
American male voice actors
Artists from Austin, Texas
Film producers from Texas
Living people
Male actors from Austin, Texas
Rooster Teeth people
Screenwriters from Texas
University of Texas at Austin alumni
Year of birth missing (living people)